is a passenger railway station in located in the city of  Tsu, Mie Prefecture, Japan, operated by Central Japan Railway Company (JR Tōkai).

Lines
Takachaya Station is served by the Kisei Main Line, and is 23.4 rail kilometers from the terminus of the line at Kameyama Station.

Station layout
The station consists of a single side platform and a single island platform connected by a footbridge. The station building, with its high ceiling, dates from the original construction of the line.

Platforms

Adjacent stations 

|-
!colspan=5|Central Japan Railway Company (JR Central)

History
The Sangū Railway started service with its initial line between Tsu Station and Miyagawa Station on December 31, 1893. The line was nationalized on October 1, 1907, becoming the Sangu Line of the Japanese Government Railways (JGR) on October 12, 1909. The station was transferred to the control of the Japan National Railways (JNR) Kisei Main Line on July 15, 1959. The station was absorbed into the JR Central network upon the privatization of the JNR on April 1, 1987. The station has been unattended since October 1, 2011.

Passenger statistics
In fiscal 2019, the station was used by an average of 551 passengers daily (boarding passengers only).

Surrounding area
Aeon Mall Tsunan
Mie Science and Technology Promotion Center
Matsusaka Iron Works Co., Ltd.
Mie Prefectural Tsu Higher Technical School
Tsu Municipal Southern Suburbs Junior High School
Tsu Municipal Takachaya Elementary School

See also
 List of railway stations in Japan

References

External links

 JR Central timetable 

Railway stations in Japan opened in 1893
Railway stations in Mie Prefecture
Tsu, Mie